In theoretical physics, a conformal family is an irreducible representation of the Virasoro algebra. In most cases, it is uniquely determined by its primary field or the highest weight vector. The family contains all of its descendant fields.

References

See also
Conformal field theory

Conformal field theory